The following lists events that happened during 2021 in the Maldives.

Incumbents
President: Ibrahim Mohamed Solih
Vice President: Faisal Naseem

Events

Ongoing
 COVID-19 pandemic in the Maldives

May
 6 May - Attempted assassination of Mohamed Nasheed

Sport
Association football
2020–21 Dhivehi Premier League
2022 SAFF U-19 Championship
2021 SAFF Championship

Other sports
Maldives at the 2020 Summer Olympics
Maldives at the 2020 Summer Paralympics

References

 
2020s in the Maldives
Years of the 21st century in the Maldives
Maldives
Maldives